William Carter may refer to:

Businessmen
William Carter (ink maker) (died 1895), American founder of what became Carter's Ink Company
William E. Carter (1875–1940), American businessman and RMS Titanic survivor
William Leonard Carter (1877–1917), British businessman and army officer

Entertainers
William Carter (actor) (1902–1952), Australian silent film actor and company director
Bill Carter (born 1966), American film director
Bill Carter (musician), American singer, songwriter and musician

Politicians
William Blount Carter (1792–1848), American politician from Tennessee
William Carter (Tasmanian politician) (1796–1878), first mayor of Hobart
William Grayson Carter (died 1849), American politician from Kentucky
William Carter (Wisconsin politician) (1833–1905), American politician from Wisconsin
Sir William Carter (mayor) (1848–1932), mayor of Windsor, England, 1908–1928
William Carter (Mansfield MP) (1862–1932), British Labour Party Member of Parliament for Mansfield, 1918–1922
William Henry Carter (1864–1955), United States Representative from Massachusetts
William Carter (St Pancras South West MP) (1867–1940), British Labour Party Member of Parliament for St Pancras South West, 1929–1931
William Arnold Carter (1907–1996), American Governor of the Panama Canal Zone, 1960–1962
William Lacy Carter (1925–2017), American politician and businessman
William Carter (Queensland politician) (1899–1969), publican and member of the Queensland Legislative Assembly
Hodding Carter III (William Hodding Carter III, born 1935), American journalist and politician, son of Hodding Carter II
W. Beverly Carter Jr. (1921–1982), American ambassador

Religious figures
William Carter (bishop) (1850–1941), Anglican bishop in Africa
William Carter (martyr) (c. 1548–1584), English printer and martyr

Sportsmen
William Carter (cricketer, born 1822) (1822–1847), English cricketer
William Carter (Surrey cricketer) (1841–1888), English cricketer
William Carter (catcher) (1889–?), American baseball player
William Carter (third baseman), American baseball player
Billy Carter (ice hockey) (born 1937), retired Canadian ice hockey forward

Others
William Harding Carter (1851–1925), United States Army major general and Medal of Honor recipient 
Hodding Carter (William Hodding Carter II, 1907–1972), American journalist
Will Carter (1912–2001), owner of the Rampant Lions Press and font designer
William Carter (photographer) (born 1934), American photographer
Billy Carter (1937–1988), younger brother of American President Jimmy Carter